Tombi Bates (née Bell; born April 19, 1979), is an U.S. Virgin Islands former professional basketball player.

Basketball career

High school
Bates played for Miami Norland Senior High School, and during her tenure there, was one of the top players in her county.

College
Bates played for the Florida Gators from 1997 to 2001. She was featured in an April 2001 article for The Gainesville Sun.

|-
| align="left" | 1997-98
| align="left" | Florida
| 25 || 1 || 14.7 || .426 || .362 || .672 || 1.8 || 1.8 || 0.6 || 0.2 || 4.1
|-
| align="left" | 1998-99
| align="left" | Florida
| 25 || 1 || 14.1 || .344 || .250 || .619 || 1.7 ||  1.8  || 0.9 || 0.2 || 3.4
|-
| align="left" | 1999-00
| align="left" | Florida
| 34 || 34 || 29.6 || .371 || .294 || .677 || 3.7 ||  6.0  || 2.5 || 0.1 || 7.1
|-
| align="left" | 2000-01
| align="left" | Florida
| 28 || 27 || 34.2 || .494 || .377 || .705 || 4.8 ||  5.0  || 2.5 || 0.2 || 12.4
|-
| align="left" | Career
| align="left" | 
| 112 || 63 || 24.0 || .426 || .362 || .672 || 3.1 || 3.8 || 1.7 || 0.2 || 6.9
|-

Professional
Bates was drafted by the Minnesota Lynx in 2001.

Post-playing career
Bates spent the 2005–2006 season as an assistant coach of the Miami Hurricanes. Bates later became an NCAA certified referee and a FIBA certified official.

Personal
Bates graduated from Florida with bachelor's degree in exercise and sports sciences with a specialization in sport management in 2002. Bates is the sister of NBA player, Raja Bell. As of 2013, Bates is a physical education teacher at José Martí MAST 6-12 Academy.

References

1979 births
Living people
American women's basketball coaches
American women's basketball players
American women educators
Florida Gators women's basketball players
Guards (basketball)
Schoolteachers from Florida
Miami Hurricanes women's basketball coaches
Minnesota Lynx draft picks
People from Saint Croix, U.S. Virgin Islands
United States Virgin Islands women's basketball players
Miami Norland Senior High School alumni
Basketball players from Miami
Sports coaches from Miami